Cairnwood is a  historic home located adjacent to the Glencairn Museum in Bryn Athyn, Montgomery County, Pennsylvania. It was designed by the architectural firm of Carrère and Hastings and built in 1895. The surrounding grounds were designed by Olmsted, Olmsted and Eliot. It was built for John Pitcairn, Jr. (1841–1916), President of Pittsburgh Plate Glass Company. It is a 2½-story, Roman brick and limestone French country estate home in the Beaux Arts style. The L-plan house has 28 rooms, plus a chapel in the third story turret. Also on the property are a contributing stable and garden house built contemporary to the main house, and garage complex (1911). A contributing structure is the estate wall. The property is now owned by the Academy of the New Church and serves as a special events facility, specifically hosting weddings, corporate functions, fundraising and social events of all kinds.

It was added to the National Register of Historic Places in 2002.  It is a contributing property to the Bryn Athyn Historic District.

References

Houses completed in 1895
Houses in Montgomery County, Pennsylvania
Houses on the National Register of Historic Places in Pennsylvania
Historic district contributing properties in Pennsylvania
Carrère and Hastings buildings
Beaux-Arts architecture in Pennsylvania
National Register of Historic Places in Montgomery County, Pennsylvania
Bryn Athyn, Pennsylvania
Pitcairn family
Gilded Age mansions